Myaing Township is a township of Pakokku District in the Magway Region of Burma (Myanmar).  Its administrative seat is Myaing.

Borders
Myaing Township is bordered by the following townships:
 Pale and Salingyi of Sagaing Region to the north;
 Yesagyo to the east;
 Pakokku Township to the south; and
 Pauk to the west.

Transport 
Since 1998 Myaing Township has been served by the branch line of the Myanmar Railways, from Pakokku to Myaing to Kyaw and on to the Myittha River valley.

Notes

External links
 "Myaing Township - Magway Division" map, Myanmar Information Management Unit (MIMU), 2010
 Township 104 on "Myanmar States/Divisions & Townships Overview Map" Myanmar Information Management Unit (MIMU)
 "Myaing Google Satellite Map" Maplandia

Townships of Magway Region